Frank Tennant (10 August 1876 – 13 January 1971) was a British stage and screen actor

Frank Tennant was born Thomas Henry Merriman in Upper Broughton, Nottinghamshire. He died at age 94 in Horsmonden, Kent.

Selected filmography
 The Murdoch Trial (1914)
 In the Ranks (1914)
 The Coal King (1915)
 A Rogue's Wife (1915)
 The Romany Rye (1915)
 The Little Minister (1915)
 Master and Man (1915)
 Flying from Justice (1915)
 Rodney Stone (1920)
 Won by a Head (1920)

References

External links
 

1876 births
1933 deaths
English male stage actors
English male film actors
People from Rushcliffe (district)
English male silent film actors
19th-century English male actors
20th-century English male actors
People from Horsmonden